Malcolm Alexander Kinnaird AC DUniv FIEAust FTSE (1933–2014) was a South Australian engineer, joint founder of international engineering company Kinhill Engineering responsible for many major engineering projects including the Alice Springs to Darwin railway. Within South Australia, he was responsible for developing West Lakes, North Haven and the David Jones building.

Kinnaird was born and educated in Adelaide, graduating with a Bachelor of Engineering in 1959.

In 1960, he founded Kinnaird Hill de Rohan and Young, (with Don Hill, Howard Young and Maurice de Rohan), which became Kinhill Pty Ltd and was acquired by Brown and Root / KBR (Kellog, Brown & Root) in 1997.

In 2003 he led the "Kinnaird Review" of the defence procurement processes which laid out an integrated approach to the management of defence procurement.

Kinnaird was the founder of the Cruising Yacht Club of South Australia.

Boards
Source:
 Executive Chairman of Kinnaird Hill de Rohan and Young / Kinhill Pty Ltd
 Chairman of Adelaide Brighton Ltd.
 Chairman of Asia Pacific Transport Pty Ltd.
 Chairman of FreightLink Pty Ltd.
 Chairman of United Water International Pty Ltd.
 Director of the Adelaide Community Healthcare Alliance Inc.
 Director of Adelaide Brighton Ltd.
 Director of FreightLink Pty Ltd. 
 Director of Macmahon Holdings Ltd.
 Director of the National Electricity Market Management Company Ltd. (NEMMCO)
 Director of United Water International Pty Ltd.
 Member of the Defence Procurement Advisory Board

Recognition
1991 Honorary Fellow of the Institution of Engineers, Australia
1991 Officer of the Order of Australia (AO)
1998 Chevalier de l'Ordre de la Legion d'Honneur
2000 Honorary Doctor of the University, University of South Australia
2001 Centenary Medal
2003 South Australian of the Year
2006 Inaugural appointee to the South Australian Engineers Hall of Fame 
2009 Companion of the Order of Australia (AC)
2010 Honorary Doctor of the University, University of Adelaide

References

1933 births
2014 deaths
Australian engineers
Companions of the Order of Australia
Fellows of the Australian Academy of Technological Sciences and Engineering